United Nations Security Council resolution 653, adopted unanimously on 20 April 1990, after recalling resolutions 644 (1989) and 650 (1990), the council endorsed a report by the Secretary-General and authorised new additions to the mandate of the United Nations Observer Group in Central America.

The addition to the mandate, after discussions between the Government of Nicaragua and the Contras, included the proposal to create five "security zones" within Nicaragua within which the Contras would demobilise.

It also requested the Secretary-General to report back to the council before the end of the current mandate on 7 May 1990.

See also
 History of Central America
 History of Nicaragua
 List of United Nations Security Council Resolutions 601 to 700 (1987–1991)

References

External links
 
Text of the Resolution at undocs.org

Nicaraguan Revolution
 0653
History of Central America
Politics of Central America
History of Nicaragua
1990 in Nicaragua
April 1990 events